The Kalbario–Patapat Natural Park is a protected area in the Philippines, located on the Patapat Mountains in the municipalities of Pagudpud and Adams in northern Ilocos Norte province.

Protected area
The park was created under the National Integrated Protected Areas System (NIPAS) of the Department of Environment and Natural Resources.

Patapat Viaduct
In the northern section of the park is the Patapat Viaduct, a  highway and part of the Pan-Philippine Highway, allowing travel along the sheer cliffs of the northern coastal mountains of Ilocos Norte overlooking the coast of Pasaleng Bay.  Part of the viaduct is an elevated highway between the cliffs and shore constructed to solve the problems of landslides during heavy rains causing accidents or closures.

See also
List of protected areas of the Philippines

References

Natural parks of the Philippines
Geography of Ilocos Norte
Tourist attractions in Ilocos Norte
Protected areas established in 2007
2007 establishments in the Philippines